Below are the rosters for the UNCAF Nations Cup 1997 tournament in Guatemala, from April 16 to April 27, 1997.

Group A

Head coach:  Horacio Cordero

Head coach:  Miguel Brindisi

Head coach:  Mauricio Cruz
 
 
 
 
DF Norman Gonzalez 19/04/1973 Nicaragua
DF Eitel Antonio Gonzalez  10/10/1970 Nicaragua
MF Harry Cruz 02/02/1972 Joe Public FC Trinidad y Tobago
MF Hector David Perez 02/02/1972 Nicaragua
MF Humberto Sanchez 04/04/1973 Nicaragua
MF Jose Maria Bermudez 15/08/1975 Walter Ferretti Nicaragua
FW Livio Jose Bendaña 22/10/1969 Walter Ferretti Nicaragua
FW Jose Morales 24/07/1974 Real Esteli Nicaragua
FW David Taylor 05/05/1974 Nicaragua
FW Hamilton West 16/10/1976 Masachapa FC Nicaragua
FW Lester Gonzalez 18/07/1972 Diriangen FC Nicaragua

Group B

Head coach:  Milovan Đorić

Head coach:  Ramón Maradiaga

Head coach:  Oscar Aristizábal
GK Donaldo Gonzalez 27/11/1971 CD Olimpia Honduras
GK David Marciaga 13/08/1976 Chepo FC Panama
DF Franklin Ulises Delgado 18/02/1966 CD Platense Honduras
DF Daniel Gomez 22/04/1973 Rio Abajo FC Panama
DF Jair Serrano 03/11/1974 Tauro FC Panama
DF Armando Velardo 17/05/1969 Euro Kickers Panama
DF Jose Alfredo Poyatos 27/11/1969 Panama
DF Agustin Castillo / /19 Panama
DF Erick Martinez 15/02/1969 Panama
MF Osvaldo Isaac Solanilla 01/12/1972 San Miguelito Panama
MF Jose Smith 10/04/1973 Atletico Chiriqui Panama
MF Ruben Elias Guevara 27/01/1964 Tauro FC Panama
MF Mario Uriel Mendez 05/01/1977 Atletico Chiriqui Panama
MF Neftali Diaz 15/12/1971 CD FAS El Salvador
MF Rolando Palma 01/10/1972 Panama
MF Angel Luis Rodriguez 15/02/1976 Tauro FC Panama
FW Percivall Antonio Piggott 23/11/1966 CD Luis Angel Firpo El Salvador
FW Patricio Guevara 13/03/1967 Tauro FC Panama
FW Julio Cesar Dely Valdes 12/03/1967 Paris Saint Germain Francia
FW Oriel Radames Avila 29/09/1974 Panama
FW Agustin Salinas 17/05/1974 Panama
FW Jorge Luis Dely Valdes 12/03/1967 Consadole Sapporo Japon

References
RSSSF Archive

1997 UNCAF Nations Cup
Copa Centroamericana squads